Baler Bay is a bay in the northeastern portion of Luzon island in the Philippines. It is an extension of the Philippine Sea and bordered by four municipalities of Aurora province.

From mid September to early March, the bay is known for its great surfing conditions. The movie Apocalypse Now, which was filmed there in 1976, introduced the sport to the area, and its production crew even left behind several surfboards for the locals to use. Since 1997, the bay has been home to the annual Aurora Surfing Cup. During the other months of the year, it is ideal for snorkeling, windsurfing and diving.

Gallery

References

Bays of the Philippines
Landforms of Aurora (province)